The Kherson Governorate (1802–1922; , translit.: Khersonskaya guberniya), was an administrative territorial unit (also translated gubernia, province, or government),  of the Russian Empire located between the Dnieper and Dniester Rivers. It was one of three governorates created in 1802 when the Novorossiya guberniya was abolished. It was known as the Mykolaiv or Nikolayev Governorate until 1803, when Nikolayev was separated into a special Nikolayev War Governorate as a center of the Black Sea Fleet and the governor seat was moved to Kherson.

The economy of the governorate was mainly based on agriculture. During the grain harvest, thousands of agricultural laborers from the parts of the Empire found work in the area. The industrial part of the economy, consisting primarily of flour milling, distilling, metalworking industry, iron mining, beet-sugar processing, and brick industry, was underdeveloped.

Administrative divisions
The governorate bordered Bessarabia Governorate to the west, with Kiev and Poltava Governorates to the north, to the east could be found Yekaterinoslav Governorate, and in the southward direction was located Taurida Governorate.

From 1809, the governorate consisted of five uyezds: Khersonsky Uyezd, Aleksandriysky Uyezd, Ovidiopol, Tiraspolsky Uyezd, and Yelisavetgradsky Uyezd. The city of Odessa carried a special status. In 1825, Odessky Uyezd and in 1834, Ananyevsky Uyezd were added into the territorial division of the Kherson Governorate. A seventh uyezd — Bobrynets,  existed from 1828 to 1865. The cities of Odessa and Nikolayev (in 1803–1861) and their surrounding vicinity were governed separately: Odessa by a gradonachalnik, answerable directly to the tsar and (from 1822) the governor-general of Novorossiya and Bessarabia, and Nikolayev by a military governor.

In 1920, while being under Soviet Ukrainian rule, the governorate's territory, was divided to form the newer Odessa Governorate. The Kherson Governorate was renamed Mykolaiv Governorate in 1921, and in 1922 - merged with the Odessa Governorate. In 1925, the Odessa Governorate was abolished, and its territory was divided into six okruhas: Kherson, Kryvyi Rih, Mykolaiv, Odessa, Pershotravneve, and Zinoviivske. In 1932, much of this territory was incorporated into the new Odessa Oblast, now an administrative division of the modern Ukrainian nation, which was divided to form the Mykolaiv Oblast.

Principal cities
From the Russian Census of 1897

 Odessa – 403,815 (Russian – 198,233, Jewish – 124,511, Ukrainian – 37,925)
 Nikolayev – 92,012 (Russian – 61,023, Jewish – 17,949, Ukrainian – 7,780)
 Yelizavetgrad – 61,488 (Jewish – 23,256, Russian – 21,301, Ukrainian – 14,523)
 Kherson – 59,076 (Russian – 27,902, Jewish – 17,162, Ukrainian – 11,591)
 Tiraspol – 31,616 (Russian – 14,013, Jewish – 8,568, Ukrainian – 3,708)
 Ananiv – 16,684 (Ukrainian – 7,205, Romanian – 4,174, Jewish – 3,514)
 Voznesensk – 15,748 (Jewish – 5,879, Ukrainian – 5,644, Russian – 2,583)
 Bobrinets – 14,281 (Ukrainian – 9,529, Jewish – 3,464, Russian – 837)
 Aleksandriya – 14,007 (Ukrainian – 7,658, Jewish – 3,687, Russian – 2,364)
 Beryslav – 12,149 (Ukrainian – 8,852, Jewish – 2,639, Russian – 524)
 Dubossary – 12,089 (Jewish – 5,326, Romanian – 3,383, Ukrainian – 2,841)
 Novogeorgiyevsk – 11,594 (Russian – 6,631, Ukrainian – 3,372, Jewish – 1,424)
 Ochakov – 10,786 (Ukrainian – 5,204, Russian – 3,508, Jewish – 1,430)
 Novomirgorod – 9,364 (Russian – 7,025, Jewish – 1,617, Ukrainian – 572)
 Grigoriopol – 7,605 (Romanian – 3,740, Russian – 1,832, Jewish – 832)
 Olviopol – 6,884 (Ukrainian – 5,022, Jewish – 1,480, Russian – 271)
 Ovidiopol – 5,187 (Ukrainian – 2,785, Russian – 1,997, Jewish – 387)
 Mayaky – 4,575 (Russian – 2,865, Ukrainian – 944, Jewish – 644)

Demographics

Until 1858, a third of the population (military settlers, admiralty settlements, foreign colonists, etc.) was subject to martial law. The gubernia had a population of about 245,000 in 1812; 893,000 in 1851; 1,330,000 in 1863; 2,027,000 in 1885; 2,733,600 in 1897; and 3,744,600 in 1914. In the 1850s it consisted of Ukrainians (68–75 %), Romanians (8–11 %), Russians (3–7 %), Jews (6 %), Germans (4 %), Bulgarians (2 %), Poles, Greeks, and Gypsies. In 1914, Ukrainians composed only 53% of the population, while Russians made up 22% and Jews - 12%. Urban dwellers made up 10 to 20 percent of the population until the 1850s, after which the proportion of urban dwellers increased, to about 30% in 1897. Migration within the Russian Empire mainly accounted for the area's population growth, with 46% of the population born outside of the governorate in 1897.

References and notes

External links
 Kherson Guberniya - Article in Brockhaus and Efron Encyclopedic Dictionary 
 Kherson Guberniya - Historical coat of arms 
 Kherson gubernia - Article in the Encyclopedia of Ukraine
 From Kherson Governorate to Kherson Oblast. Kherson regional universal science library of Oles Honchar.

 
Governorates of the Russian Empire
Political history of Ukraine
Governorates of Ukraine
States and territories established in 1802
1802 establishments in the Russian Empire
1802 establishments in Ukraine
1922 disestablishments in Ukraine